Anthony David Yates (born 5 May 1946) is a British solicitor and academic. He was Warden of Robinson College, Cambridge for twenty years between 2001 and 2021. Previously, he was Professor of Law at the University of Essex from 1979 to 1987, Dean of its School of Law from 1979 to 1984, and Pro-Vice-Chancellor of the university from 1985 to 1987. He was a partner at Baker & McKenzie from 1987 to 2001, and Chief Operating Officer of the law firm from 1998 to 2001.

References

 

 
 
 

1946 births
Living people
British solicitors
British legal scholars
Academics of the University of Essex
Wardens of Robinson College, Cambridge
Place of birth missing (living people)
People associated with Baker McKenzie